American rock band Blink-182 has received 21 awards from 39 nominations. They are the recipients of ten San Diego Music Awards, three Teen Choice Awards, two Kerrang! Awards, two MTV Europe Music Awards, one Blockbuster Entertainment Awards, one California Music Awards, one MTV Video Music Awards and one Nickelodeon Kids' Choice Awards.

Alternative Press Music Awards

|-
| 2017
|Blink-182
| Artist of the Year  
| 
|}

Billboard Music Awards

|-
| 1999 || "What's My Age Again?" || Modern Rock Track of the Year ||

Blockbuster Entertainment Awards

|-
|2000 || Blink-182 || Favorite Group – New Artist ||

California Music Awards

|-
|2004 || Blink-182 || Outstanding Hard Rock Album ||

Echo Awards

|-
|rowspan="2"| 2001 || Blink-182 || Best International Rock/Alternative Group || 
|-
| Blink-182 || Best International Newcomer ||

Grammy Awards

|-
| 2017 || California || Best Rock Album ||

iHeartRadio Much Music Video Awards

|-
| 2000 || "All the Small Things" || Best International Video ||

iHeartRadio Music Awards

|-
|rowspan="2"| 2017 || Blink-182 || Alternative Rock Band of the Year || 
|-
| "Bored to Death" || Alternative Rock Song of the Year || 
|-
| 2023 || "Edging" || Alternative Song of the Year || 
|-

Kerrang! Awards
The Kerrang! Awards is an annual awards ceremony established in 1993 by Kerrang!. Blink-182 has received two awards.

|-
| 2000 || "All the Small Things" || Best Video || 
|-
|rowspan="2"| 2004 || Blink-182 || Best Album || 
|-
| Blink-182 || Best International Band || 
|-
| 2016 || Blink-182 || The Icon Award ||

MTV Europe Music Awards
The MTV Europe Music Awards is an annual awards ceremony established in 1994 by MTV Europe. Blink-182 has received two awards.

|-
| 2000 || Blink-182 || Best New Act || 
|-
| 2001 || Blink-182 || Best Rock Act ||

MTV Video Music Awards
The MTV Video Music Awards is an annual awards ceremony established in 1984 by MTV. Blink-182 has received one award from six nominations.

|-
|rowspan="3"|  ||rowspan="3"| "All the Small Things" || Best Group Video || 
|-
| Video of the Year || 
|-
| Best Pop Video || 
|-
|  || "First Date" || Best Group Video || 
|-
|rowspan="2"|  ||rowspan="2"| "Happy Days" || Best Rock Video || 
|-
| Best Music Video from Home ||

Nickelodeon Kids' Choice Awards
The Nickelodeon Kids' Choice Awards is an annual awards show organized by Nickelodeon. Blink-182 has received one award.

|-
| 2001 || Blink-182 || Favorite Band ||

San Diego Music Awards

|-
| 1997 || Dude Ranch || Best Alternative or Punk Album || 
|-
| 1998 || Blink-182 || Group of the Year || 
|-
| 1999 || Blink-182 || Group of the Year || 
|-
| 1999 || Blink-182 || Best Ska or Punk Band || 
|-
| 1999 || Enema of the State || Album of the Year || 
|-
| 2000 || Blink-182 || Group of the Year || 
|-
| 2000 || Blink-182 || Best Punk Band || 
|-
| 2001 || Take Off Your Pants and Jacket || Best Punk Album || 
|-
| 2001 || Blink-182 || Group of the Year || 
|-
| 2004 || Blink-182 || Best Punk Album || 
|-
| 2017 || California || Album of the Year || 
|-
| 2017 || "She's Out of Her Mind" || Song of the Year ||

Teen Choice Awards
The Teen Choice Awards is an awards show presented annually by the Fox Broadcasting Company. Blink-182 has received three awards.

|-
| 2000 || Blink-182 || Choice Rock Group || 

|-
| 2001 || Blink-182 || Best Rock Group || 
|-
| 2004 || "I Miss You" || Choice Love Song ||

Notes

References

Awards
Lists of awards received by American musician
Lists of awards received by musical group